Providence Holy Cross Medical Center is a hospital in the Mission Hills district of Los Angeles, California, US.  The hospital has 377 beds, and is part of Providence Health & Services.

History
Holy Cross Medical Center was founded in 1961 by the Sisters of the Holy Cross from Notre Dame, Indiana. On May 1, 1996, the Sisters of Providence assumed sponsorship of the hospital, adding Providence to the name. On November 14, 2019, two victims of the Saugus High School shooting were transported to the hospital.

Services
Providence Holy Cross Medical Center has operated a trauma center since 1984. The hospital also operates Providence Holy Cross Health Center in Valencia and Providence Holy Cross Health Center in Porter Ranch.

References

External links

Hospitals in Los Angeles
Hospitals in the San Fernando Valley
Mission Hills, Los Angeles
Holy Cross
Roman Catholic Archdiocese of Los Angeles
Hospital buildings completed in 1961
Hospitals established in 1961
1961 establishments in California
Trauma centers